The Zoar Norwegian Lutheran Church is a historic church in rural northeastern Day County, South Dakota.  It is a modest wood-frame structure, set on a rise south of County Road 4 northeast of Pickerel Lake.  It has Gothic Revival styling, and a bell tower capped by a steeple with flared roof.  Built in 1904, it is one of a few surviving period country churches in the region, and is distinctive for its use by a Norwegian-American community in an area predominantly populated by Polish immigrants.

The church was listed on the National Register of Historic Places in 1990.

References

Lutheran churches in South Dakota
Norwegian-American culture in South Dakota
Churches on the National Register of Historic Places in South Dakota
Gothic Revival church buildings in South Dakota
Buildings and structures in Day County, South Dakota
National Register of Historic Places in Day County, South Dakota